Look Pleasant, Please is a 1918 American short comedy film featuring Harold Lloyd. A print of the film is held by the Museum of Modern Art.

Plot
Bebe is one of a group of females who go to a photographer's studio to have their pictures taken.  The amorous photographer has "frolicky fingers".  When he gets too friendly with Bebe, she telephones her husband who vows to come to the studio to murder the photographer.  Shortly afterward, Harold, a dishonest greengrocer, is pursued by a group of policemen.  During his flight from them, he happens to enter the photographer's studio. Initially the photographer mistakes Harold for Bebe's irate husband.  When he realizes that Harold is harmless, the photographer tells Harold he can have the run of the studio—in the hopes that Bebe's husband will think that Harold is the photographer.  Harold attempts to photograph an old woman, a group of three drunkards and a pretty chorus girl before the jealous husband arrives.  A large scuffle ensues.  Eventually the husband is arrested and Harold and Bebe are photographed together.

Cast
 Harold Lloyd
 Snub Pollard
 Bebe Daniels
 William Blaisdell
 Sammy Brooks
 Lige Conley (credited as Lige Cromley)
 Billy Fay
 William Gillespie
 Lew Harvey
 Gus Leonard
 James Parrott
 Dorothea Wolbert

Reception
Like many American films of the time, Look Pleasant, Please was subject to cuts by city and state film censorship boards. For example, the Chicago Board of Censors cut the man lying on the floor looking at the young woman's legs and sticking a man with a hairpin and the vulgar actions following.

See also
 Harold Lloyd filmography

References

External links

1918 films
1918 comedy films
1918 short films
Silent American comedy films
American black-and-white films
Films directed by Alfred J. Goulding
American silent short films
Films with screenplays by H. M. Walker
American comedy short films
1910s American films